Goeppertia insignis (syn. Calathea lancifolia, Goeppertia lancifolia), the rattlesnake plant, is a species of flowering plant in the Marantaceae family, native to Rio de Janeiro state in Brazil.  

Cultivation 
Goeppertia insignis prefers indirect sunlight. These plants want well-drained, but moist, soil. They like a pH of 6.1 to 7.3.

Leaves 
The bottom side of the leaves are purple, with the adaxial surface having what look like dark green alternating large and small leaflets overlaid on the light green leaf. Like other prayer plants, its leaves fold together at night, and unfold again in the morning.

References

insignis
House plants
Endemic flora of Brazil
Flora of Rio de Janeiro (state)
Plants described in 2017